The Buchanan family is a long-running family of fictional characters on the American soap opera One Life to Live. The ensemble was originally inspired by the Ewing family on the primetime soap opera Dallas, and appeared from September 1979 through the end of the serial in August 2013.

Generations

Ancestors
 Jasper Buchanan  Unseen character. Father of Buck, great-grandfather of Asa Buchanan.
 Buck Buchanan (Philip Carey) Paternal grandfather of Asa Buchanan.
 Dorothy "Blaize" Pardee Buchanan (Loyita Chapel) Paternal grandmother of Asa Buchanan.

First generation

 Asa Buchanan (Philip Carey) Born off-screen October 31, 1924; dies onscreen August 16, 2007. Brother to Pike and Jeannie.
 Pike Buchanan (Don Chastain, Tom Atkins)  Brother of Asa and Jeannie.
 Jeannie Buchanan  Unseen character; dies off-screen.
 Wanda Webb (Marilyn Chris, Lee Lawson)  Born off-screen circa 1938. Sister of Paul, second cousin of Asa, Pike and Jeannie.
 Paul Webb  Unseen character; dies off-screen. Brother of Wanda, second cousin of Asa, Pike and Jeannie.

Second generation
 Clint Buchanan (Clint Ritchie, Jerry verDorn)  Born off-screen March 9, 1945, to Asa Buchanan and Olympia Bonard Buchanan.
 Bo Buchanan (Robert S. Woods)  Born off-screen April 18, 1948, to Asa Buchanan and Olympia Bonard Buchanan.
 Austin Buchanan (David Gautreaux)  Born circa 1951 to Pike Buchanan and Rebecca Buchanan; dies onscreen August 1989.
 Rafe Garretson (Ken Meeker) Born circa 1957 to Jeannie Buchanan Garretson and Miguel Garretson.
 Ben Davidson (Mark Derwin)  Born off-screen March 27, 1961, to Asa Buchanan and Renée Divine, adopted by Sam Davidson and Jane Rappaport; dies onscreen May 27, 2004.
 Jason Webb (Mark Brettschneider)  Born circa 1969 to Paul Webb and Donna Webb.

Third generation
 Cordero "Cord" Roberts (John Loprieno)  Born off-screen November 1, 1968, to Clint Buchanan and Maria Roberts.
 David Vickers Buchanan (Tuc Watkins)  Born off-screen 1965 to Bo Buchanan and Emma Bradley, adopted by Ned Truman; birth year changed to 1969 as of 2008.
 Kevin Lord Riley Buchanan (Kevin Stapleton, Timothy Gibbs, Dan Gauthier, and others)  Born onscreen September 12, 1976, to Joe Riley Sr. and Victoria Lord Riley, adopted by Clint Buchanan; birth year changed to 1970 as of 1995 then 1965 in 2004.
 Joseph "Joey" Francis Riley Buchanan (Nathan Fillion, Don Jeffcoat, Bruce Michael Hall, Tom Degnan, and others)  Born onscreen January 8, 1980, to Joe Riley Sr. and Victoria Lord Riley, adopted by Clint Buchanan; birth year changed to 1976 as of 1992.
 Drew Buchanan (Keith Bogart, Victor Browne, Sam Ball and child actors)  Born onscreen September 23, 1983, to Bo Buchanan and Becky Lee Hunt Abbott Buchanan, birth year changed to 1976 as of 1989; dies onscreen September 16, 1998.
 Jessica Eugenia Buchanan (Erin Torpey, Bree Williamson, and child actors)  Born off-screen September 23, 1986, to Clint Buchanan and Victoria Lord Buchanan; birth year changed to 1981 as of 2001 then to 1978 in 2005. Fraternal twin of Natalie Buchanan.
 Natalie Buchanan (Melissa Archer)  Born onscreen September 23, 1986, to Clint Buchanan and Victoria Lord Buchanan; birth year 1981 as of 2001, then to 1978 in 2005. Fraternal twin of Jessica Buchanan.
 Rex Balsom (John-Paul Lavoisier)  Born off-screen 1983  later change to 1978 to Clint Buchanan and Echo DiSavoy, adopted by Walter Balsom and Roxy Lipschitz Balsom; birth year changed to 1979 as of 2010.
 Sammi Garretson (Danielle Harris and others)  Born onscreen May 16, 1985, to Rafe Garretson and Samantha Vernon, surrogate mother Delilah Ralston; birth year changed to 1979 as of 1985.
 Matthew Buchanan (Eddie Alderson, Robert Gorrie and child actors)  Born onscreen February 22, 1999, to Bo Buchanan and Nora Hanen Buchanan; birth year changed to 1994 as of 2001 and to 1992 as of 2013)

Fourth generation
 Clinton James "C. J." Roberts (Tyler Noyes and others)  Born onscreen April 3, 1987, to Cord Roberts and Tina Lord Roberts; birth year changed to 1981 as of 1992.
 Sarah Victoria Roberts (Hayden Panettiere, Shanelle Workman, Justis Bolding and child actors)  Born onscreen February 6, 1991, to Cord Roberts and Tina Lord Roberts; birth year changed to 1985 as of 1994.
 Demerest "Duke" Buchanan (Matthew Metzger and child actors)  Born onscreen June 29, 1992, to Kevin Buchanan and LeeAnn Demerest Buchanan, birth year changed to 1986 as of 2004; dies onscreen May 12, 2006.
 Bree Victoria Brennan (Stephanie Schmahl and others) Born onscreen May 1, 2006, to Jessica Buchanan Brennan and Nash Brennan.
 Shane Morasco Balsom (Austin Williams)  Born off-screen March 25, 1998 to Rex Balsom and Gigi Morasco.
 Liam Asa McBain (child actors)  Born onscreen January 11, 2011, to Natalie Buchanan and John McBain as of 2011.
 Ryder Asa Ford (child actors)  Born onscreen January 11, 2011, to Jessica Buchanan and Robert Ford as of 2011.
 Drew Buchanan II (child actors)  Born onscreen January 13, 2012, to Matthew Buchanan and Destiny Evans; birth year changed to 2010 as of 2013.

Fifth generation
 Zane Buchanan (child actors)  Born onscreen October 31, 2006 then to October 31,1995 in 2010, to Duke Buchanan and Kelly Cramer.

History
Clint Buchanan arrives in Llanview, Pennsylvania in September 1979, soon followed by his brother Bo in November and their father Asa in December 1979. Clint marries central heroine Victoria Lord Riley in 1982, cementing the family's prominence in the series.

Clint adopts Viki's sons Kevin and Joey Riley, and in 1986 discovers he has an adult son, Cord Roberts, with old flame Maria. Clint and Viki have a daughter of their own, Jessica, that same year. In 2001 it is revealed that Viki had been pregnant with twins, one fathered by Clint and the other by Viki's nemesis Mitch Laurence; Jessica turns out to be Mitch's daughter, and Clint and Viki's child — kidnapped at birth — is a young woman named Natalie. On January 6, 2012, Allison Perkins revealed that Nataile and Jessica  are both biologically Clint's daughters.

In 1983, Bo and Becky Lee Abbott have a son they name Drew, who ultimately becomes a police officer and dies in the line of duty in 1998. In February 1999, Bo fathers a son (later named Matthew) with wife Nora, though Matthew is thought to be Sam Rappaport's biological child until 2003.

Patriarch Asa marries multiple women during his decades in Llanview, and in 1999 Viki's husband Ben Davidson turns out to be Asa's biological son. Ben is shot and slips into a coma in 2002; he eventually dies in 2004. Asa passes away on August 16, 2007, and it is revealed that he had believed con-man David Vickers is his son. David is ultimately proven to be Bo's biological child in 2009.

In 2010, it is revealed that Rex Balsom, the man who was raised with Natalie by Roxy Balsom, is actually Clint's son with Echo DiSavoy, who was conceived after an affair in 1983 later revised to 1978.

Buchanan Enterprises
Buchanan Enterprises, founded by billionaire Asa Buchanan, is a multinational, family-owned corporation with offices worldwide. After visiting in Llanview in 1979, Texas-born Asa moves the headquarters of his company to Llanview in 1980 to stay close to sons Clint and Bo. As ruthless in business as he is devoted to his family, Asa's machinations (and attempts to both protect and control his family members) drive much of the drama in the series over the next two decades. In 1997, Clint's son Cord Roberts leaves Llanview for the London office of Buchanan Enterprises, and in 1998 Clint follows him. Clint returns to Llanview for good in 2005, and his adopted son Kevin later succeeds him in London in late 2006. Clint's daughter Natalie joins the company in 2007 after a failed attempt to become a police forensics investigator. Natalie's sister Jessica as well soon joins B.E. to fund her husband Nash's vineyard. Asa remained at B.E.'s helm until his death in August 2007 in which his son Clint succeed him as CEO. Asa's will forces his heirs to work together as board members for the company to earn their inheritance. The usually-upstanding Clint finds himself using the underhanded tactics of his father to fend off the multiple takeover attempts of Asa's business rivals. Fueled by a desire for personal revenge against Clint, Dr. Dorian Lord plots a secret, hostile take-over of the company, which succeeds at the Buchanan Enterprises shareholder meeting on June 3, 2008.  Dorian renames the company Cramer Enterprises. In October 2008, District Attorney and Clint's love interest, Nora Hanen, manages to finesse Dorian into signing controlling interest of the company back to the Buchanan family in exchange for dropping potential attempted murder charges.  The company is re-christened Buchanan Enterprises or BE.

In December 2008, the Buchanans gather for a video message from Asa. A year prior, Asa had stipulated in his will that the family had one year to fulfill a challenge in order to receive their inheritance: work together as a family to raise the price of BE stocks. If they succeeded, they would be rich, if they failed...they would not receive a cent. Due to the takeover commandeered by Dorian and the near collapse of the US economy, BE shares have declined. As punishment, the Buchanan inheritance is left to Asa's long-lost son, David Vickers. David learns of his true parentage, and soon claims what is his. However, a DNA test confirms that David is instead Bo's son, rendering Asa's original will null and void.

On episode first run June 28, 2011, in order for Clint Buchanan to get a heart transplant and live, he was forced to give his estranged son Rex Balsom Buchanan Enterprises. In return, Clint would get Rex's finances, Gigi Morasco's heart. All existing shares, funds and properties were signed over to Rex Balsom. On the October 21 episode of that year, Rex Balsom returned all of the Buchanan holdings to its rightful owner Clint Buchanan.

Subsidiaries

 Lone Star Records - record label started and run by Bo Buchanan in the 1980s. It was sold to rapper Snoop Dogg in 2008.
 Cobb Industries - A company owned by rival Warren Cobb, but was bought out by B.E. in the 2008.
 Webster International - a company owned by Virgil Webster another rival of Asa Buchanan, but was bought out by B.E. in 2008.

Employees

 Clint Buchanan – majority shareholder; chairman of the board and CEO
 Bo Buchanan – senior member of the board of directors; and former head of Buchanan Enterprises Security
 Cord Roberts – president of Buchanan International offices in London; member of the board of directors
 Kevin Buchanan – in charge of Buchanan Enterprises offices in London; member of the board of directors
 Joey Buchanan – in charge of Buchanan Enterprises offices in London; member of the board of directors
 Rex Balsom – member of the board of directors
 Natalie Buchanan Banks – member of the board of directors
 Jessica Buchanan Brennan – member of the board of directors
 C.J. Roberts – member of the board of directors
 Sarah Roberts – member of the board of directors
 Matthew Buchanan – executive assistant to Clint Buchanan

Former employees
 Asa Buchanan – founder and former chairman of the board and CEO
 Cameron Wallace – personal assistant to Cord Roberts
 Duke Buchanan – intern
 Margaret Cochran – accountant
 Dorian Cramer Lord – former chairwoman and CEO of (Cramer Enterprises)
 David Vickers Buchanan – former CEO of Buchanan Enterprises
 Kelly Cramer – public relations
 Pamela Stuart – former board member of Buchanan Enterprises
 Alex Olanov – former board member of Buchanan Enterprises
 Ben Davidson – former board member of Buchanan Enterprises
 Jared Banks – former executive vice-president of Buchanan Enterprises
 Kimberly Andrews – former executive assistant to Clint Buchanan
 Rex Balsom – former chairman and CEO of Buchanan Enterprises

Family tree

|-
|
|-
|

|-
|style="text-align: left;"|Notes:

Descendants

|-
|style="text-align: left;"|
 Jasper Buchanan (deceased)
 m. Unnamed woman (deceased)
   c. Buck Buchanan (deceased)
     m. Dorothy "Blaize" Pardée [married 1888]
       c. Pike Buchanan (deceased)
         m. Rebecca maiden name unknown (deceased)
         m. Jeanette maiden name unknown [dissolved 1989]
       c. Asa Buchanan (born 1924; died 2007)
         m. Olympia Buchanan [dissolved 1981]
           c. Clint Buchanan (born 1945)
             a. Maria Roberts
               c. Cord Roberts (born 1961 revised to 1968)
                 m. Tina Lord [1986-87;1988–90; 1991–93; divorced]
                   c. C. J. Roberts (born 1987 revised to 1981)
                   c. Sarah Roberts (born 1991 revised to 1985)
                 m. Kate Sanders [1987; invalid]
                 m. Tina Lord [2011–present; married]
             m. Victoria Lord [1982-85; divorced]
               c. Kevin Buchanan {adopted by Clint}
                 m. LeeAnn Demerest [1992–93; divorced]
                   c. Duke Buchanan (born 1992 revised to 1986; died 2006)
                     a. Kelly Cramer
                       c. Zane Buchanan (born 2006 revised to 1995)
                 m. Cassie Callison [1998–99; annulled]
                 m. Kelly Cramer [200?–04; divorced]
                   c. Kevin Buchanan Jr. (born 2004; stillborn)
               c. Joey Buchanan {adopted by Clint}
                 m. Kelly Cramer [2000-01; divorced]
                 m. Jennifer Rappaport [2003–04; divorced]
                   c. Unnamed child (miscarriage)
                 m. Aubrey Wentworth [2011; divorced]
             a. Echo DiSavoy
               c. Rex Balsom (born 1984)
                 a. Gigi Morasco
                   c. Shane Morasco (born 1998 revised to 1997)
                 m. Jennifer Rappaport [2003; annulled]
                 m. Adriana Cramer [2008; divorced]
                 a. Stacy Morasco
                   c. Unnamed child (miscarriage)
                 m. Gigi Morasco [2011–present; married]
             m. Victoria Lord [1986-94; divorced]
               c. Jessica Buchanan (born 1986; twin)
                 a. Will Rappaport
                   c. Megan Buchanan (born 1999; stillborn)
                 m. Tico Santi [2004; annulled]
                 a. Nash Brennan
                   c. Bree Brennan (born 2006)
                 m. Antonio Vega [2006-07; divorced]
                 m. Nash Brennan [2007-08; widowed]
                   c. Chloe Brennan (born 2008; stillborn)
                 a. Robert Ford
                   c. Ryder Ford (born 2011)
                 m. Robert Ford [2011; annulled]
                 m. Cutter Wentworth [2011; annulled]
               c. Natalie Buchanan (born 1986 revised to 1978; twin)
                 m. Mitch Laurence [2002-03; annulled]
                 m. Cristian Vega [2004-06; divorced]
                 m. Jared Banks [2009; widowed]
                 a. John McBain [engaged]
                   c. Liam McBain (born 2011)
             m. Lindsay Rappaport [1998-99; annulled]
             m. Nora Hanen [2009-10; divorced]
             m. Kimberly Andrews [2010; annulled]
           c. Bo Buchanan (born 1948)
             a. Emma Bradley (deceased)
               c. David Vickers Buchanan (born 1969 Originally 1965)
                 a. Unnamed woman
                   c. Unnamed child
                 m. Tina Lord [1995; divorced]
                 m. Dorian Lord [1995-96; divorced]
                 m. Alex Olanov [2007; annulled]
                 m. Addie Cramer [2008; divorced]
                 m. Dorian Lord [2010–present; married]
             a. Becky Lee Abbott
               c. Drew Buchanan (born 1983 revised to 1976; died 1998)
             m. Delilah Ralston [1983–84; divorced]
             m. Didi O'Neill [1986–88; widowed]
             m. Sarah Gordon [1990–92; widowed]
             m. Cassie Callison [1991; invalid]
             m. Nora Hanen [1995–99; divorced]
               c. Matthew Buchanan (born 1999 revised to 1994 then 1992)
                 a. Destiny Evans
                   c. Drew Buchanan II (born 2012 revised to 2010)
             m. Nora Hanen [2010–present; married]
         a. Renée Divine
           c. Ben Davidson (born 1961; died 2004)
             m. Skye Chandler [1998-99; divorced]
             m. Victoria Lord [2000-04; dissolved]
       c. Jeannie Buchanan (deceased)
         m. Miguel Garretson (deceased)
           m. Unnamed woman
             c. Rafe Garretson (adopted by Jeannie)
               m. Samantha Vernon [1984; dissolved]
                 c. Samantha "Sami" Garretson (born 1985 revised to 1979; carried by Delilah)
               m. Delilah Ralston [1987–present; married]
 |-
 |style="text-align: left;"|Notes
 |-
 |style="text-align: left;"|

References

External links
 Buchanan family tree – ABC.com
 Buchanan family tree – SoapCentral.com

One Life to Live characters
One Life to Live families